Eucalyptus comitae-vallis, commonly known as Comet Vale mallee or Cowcowing mallee, is a mallee that is endemic to the south-west of Western Australia. It has rough, flaky to ribbony bark on the trunk and larger branches, smooth withish bark above, linear to narrow lance-shaped adult leaves, flower buds in groups of seven to eleven, white flowers and barrel-shaped, conical or cup-shaped fruit.

Description
The bark is rough, ribbony and grey on the trunks and larger branches then smooth and pinkish grey yellow-green above. Flowering occurs from February to April and the flowers are white.

Taxonomy
Eucalyptus comitae-vallis was first formally described in 1923 by Joseph Maiden from a specimen collected from Comet Vale by John Thomas Jutson. The description was published in Maiden's book, A Critical Revision of the Genus Eucalyptus. The specific epithet (comitae-vallis) is the latinised version of the type location.

In 1934, William Blakely described Eucalyptus brachycorys but the name is considered by the Australian Plant Census to be a synonym.

Distribution
Comet Vale mallee is mainly found between Menzies and Kalgoorlie in the Mid West, Wheatbelt and Goldfields-Esperance regions of Western Australia where it grows in sandy-clay-loamy soils in open shrubland.

Conservation status
This eucalypt is classified as "not threatened" by the Western Australian Government Department of Parks and Wildlife.

See also
List of Eucalyptus species

References

comitae-vallis
Endemic flora of Western Australia
Mallees (habit)
Myrtales of Australia
Eucalypts of Western Australia
Plants described in 1923
Taxa named by Joseph Maiden